
Southwood may refer to:

Places

Australia
Southwood, Queensland, a town and locality in the Western Downs Region

Canada
Southwood, Calgary, a neighbourhood in Calgary, Alberta, Canada
Southwood, Edmonton, Alberta
Southwood, Ontario

United Kingdom
Southwood, Derbyshire, a hamlet near Swadlincote
Southwood, Hampshire, a suburb in Farnborough, Hampshire, United Kingdom
Southwood, Norfolk
Southwood, Somerset
Southwood, Worcestershire, a location
South Wood, a wood in Kent
South Hayling, Hampshire, formerly called "Southwood"

United States
 Southwood, Alabama, a place in Alabama
 SouthWood, Tallahassee, Florida, a planned community
 Southwood, Indiana, an unincorporated community
 Southwood, Louisiana, in Ascension Parish, Louisiana#Unincorporated communities
 Southwood, New York

Education
 Southwood Boys Grammar School, an independent school in Ringwood, Victoria
 Southwood Middle School, a public school in Palmetto Bay, Florida
 Southwood Secondary School, a Canadian high school in Cambridge, Ontario
 Southwood High School, a high school in Shreveport, Louisiana

Persons
Richard Southwood, British ecologist
Thomas Southwood Smith, English physician and sanitary reformer
Nicholas Southwood, Australian philosopher
Nick Southwood, British songwriter